Oncidium cheirophorum is a species of orchid found from Chiapas state in SW Mexico, through Central America, to Colombia. The flowers of this plant are yellow and shiny, and have a slight fragrance.

References

cheirophorum
Orchids of Central America
Orchids of Colombia
Orchids of Mexico
Orchids of Chiapas